Darevskia armeniaca,  commonly known as the Armenian lizard or the Armenian rock lizard, is a parthenogenetic (unisexually breeding) species (or form) of Darevskia, a genus of lizards belonging to the family Lacertidae, the wall lizards. Darevskia armeniaca is native to the Armenian Highland.

Geographic range
It is found in northeastern Turkey, northern and northwestern Armenia, southern Georgia, and western Azerbaijan.

Gallery

References

Further reading
Méhelÿ, Lajos von. 1909. Materialien zu einer Systematik und Phylogenie der muralis-änlichen Lacerten. Annales historico-naturales Musei nationalis Hungarici, Budapest 7 (2): 409–621. (Lacerta saxicola armeniaca, n. subsp., pp. 549–555).

Darevskia
Reptiles of Armenia
Reptiles of Azerbaijan
Endemic fauna of Armenia
Reptiles described in 1909
Taxa named by Lajos Méhelÿ